The 2017 Il Lombardia was a road cycling one-day race that took place on 7 October. It was the 111th edition of the Il Lombardia and the 36th event of the 2017 UCI World Tour. It was won for the second time by Vincenzo Nibali. The race was marred by several severe accidents, all on the fast and technical descent  of the Sormano hill. Laurens De Plus suffered a small fracture to his right knee when he was launched over the guardrail and fell into a ravine. Jan Bakelants remained hospitalised in Como with seven broken ribs and two fractures to his spine. Simone Petilli was diagnosed after his crash at the same site with two back fractures, a broken collarbone and shoulder blade.

Results

References

Il Lombardia
Il Lombardia
Giro di Lombardia
Il Lombardia